Sergey Lynko (born 16 October 1989) is a Belarusian professional footballer who plays for Molodechno.

Career
On 21 February 2020, the Football Federation of Armenia announced that FC Yerevan had withdrawn from the league due to financial and technical problems.

References

External links 
 
 

1989 births
Living people
Belarusian footballers
Association football midfielders
Belarusian expatriate footballers
Expatriate footballers in Armenia
FC Darida Minsk Raion players
FC Isloch Minsk Raion players
FC Torpedo Minsk players
FC Yerevan players
FC Krumkachy Minsk players
FC Dynamo Brest players
FC Molodechno players